Lepturginus is a genus of beetles in the family Cerambycidae, containing the following species:

 Lepturginus obscurellus Gilmour, 1959
 Lepturginus tigrellus (Bates, 1874)

References

Acanthocinini